Nicholas Goluses is a professor of classical guitar at the Eastman School of Music at the University of Rochester. Goluses has held the Andrés Segovia Chair at the Manhattan School of Music, as the founder and chair of that school's guitar department. He has recorded seven albums for Naxos including "Bach: Sonatas Transcribed for Guitar" and "Sor: Fantaisies / Progressive Studies." He is one of the only guitarists to have transcribed and recorded all three of Bach's violin sonatas. James Jolly in the Gramophone Classical Music Guide 2010 wrote that Goluses' Guitar Collection: Sor set "a benchmark for present-day guitarists.” 

Nicholas Goluses's concert tours as soloist, with orchestra, and as chamber musician have taken him across North America, South America, Europe, Australia, and the Far East to critical acclaim.  His many New York recitals have taken place in Merkin Hall, Weill Hall at Carnegie Hall, Alice Tully Hall and Kaufmann Auditorium at the 92nd Street Y.  Goluses has been a featured performer at major festivals throughout the world and has performed as concerto soloist with the Los Angeles Philharmonic, New Jersey Symphony, Colorado Symphony, Rochester Philharmonic, American Wind Orchestra, Manhattan Symphony, Louisiana Sinfonietta, Jacksonville Symphony, Eastman Virtuosi, Heidelberg Symphony, Savannah Symphony, Guanajuato Symphony, Rochester Chamber Orchestra, Eastman Philharmonia, and the Macon Symphony among others.  He enjoys an active duo with flutist Bonita Boyd and has collaborated with the American and Ying String Quartets, violinists Zvi Zeitlin and Juliana Athayde and tenor Robert Swensen.  His 2017-18 season was highlighted by a concert tour of China, comprising 23 cities throughout the country, as well as concerts in Belgium, Ireland, and throughout the US.

Dr. Goluses is Professor of Guitar at the Eastman School of Music, where he is currently CoChair of the Strings, Harp and Guitar Department and recipient of the Eisenhart Award for Excellence in Teaching.  Before coming to Eastman he was the first Andrés Segovia Professor at Manhattan School of Music where he received the Doctor of Musical Arts degree, and was the recipient of the Pablo Casals Award and the Faculty Award of Distinguished Merit.  His students have won major awards and competitions throughout the world including Darwin (Australia), Allentown, GFA, D’Addario, MTNA, Appalachian, Taxco (Mexico), Rantucci, Rosario, Stotsenburg, Paracho (Mexico), Brock (Canada) World Competition, Philadelphia Guitar Society, Lone Star Competition, Louisville Competition, Memphis Competition, Harvard Foote Prize, Hamilton, Belgium, Fulbright, CAPES (Brazil) and a Grammy.  In addition his students hold numerous professorships throughout the US, Australia, Mexico, Canada, Brazil, England, Taiwan, and Germany.  Prof. Goluses is in great demand for master classes at leading institutions throughout the world.

Goluses has recorded for Naxos, Albany, BMG, Nueva Venecia, and Linn Records.  His solo recordings for Naxos have received wide critical and audience acclaim.  He has recorded two duo CDs with Bonita Boyd for Albany Records (Chronicles of Discovery and Quicksilver, with soprano Katheryn Lewek), and Night Strings with violist George Taylor.  His newest solo CD, “From Afar”, includes works by Britten, Schwantner, Ponce, Falla.  His 2018 CD for Linn Records of the music of Samuel Adler features Maestro Adler's Concerto for Guitar and Orchestra, Ports of Call with Juliana Athade and Renée Jolles, violinists, Into the Radiant Boundaries of Light with violist Phillip Ying, and Five Choral Scherzi with the Eastman Chorus and violist Randolph Kelley.

Committed to performing new music for the guitar, Goluses has given world première performances of over 100 works, including solo pieces, concertos for guitar and orchestra, as well as chamber music by many of today's leading composers.  His performance editions are published by Alfred Masterworks.

He is a member of the National Academy of Recording Arts and Sciences,  has served on the Board of Directors for the Guitar Foundation of America and has been named Musician of the Year by Mu Phi Epsilon.  Nicholas Goluses is the recipient of the centennial Distinguished Alumni Award from Manhattan School of Music (2019).

Nicholas Goluses has been named recipient of a Fulbright Specialist Award for the years 2020-2023.

References

External links
 "Nicholas Goluses" (personal web site)
 "Interlochen Public Radio: Nicholas Goluses", June 23, 2011
 "Backstage Pass presents Nicholas Goluses: Hosted by WXXI-FM's Julia Figueras," WXXI.org

Eastman School of Music faculty
Living people
Year of birth missing (living people)
Albany Records artists